Jessy Anna Kramer (born 16 February 1990) is a Dutch handball player for Toulon Handball and the Dutch national team.

She participated at the 2011 World Women's Handball Championship in Brazil and was a part of the Dutch squad that won silver at the 2015 World Women's Handball Championship in Denmark, bronze at the 2017 World Women's Handball Championship in Germany and gold at the 2019 World Women's Handball Championship in Japan.

References

External links

1990 births
Living people
Dutch female handball players
People from Niedorp
Dutch expatriate sportspeople in France
Dutch expatriate sportspeople in Germany
Dutch expatriate sportspeople in Norway
Expatriate handball players
Sportspeople from North Holland
21st-century Dutch women